The Southeast Slovenia Statistical Region is a statistical region in southeast Slovenia. It is the largest statistical region. The development of this region is largely the result of industry (the auto industry, pharmaceuticals, and other light industry), which generated nearly half of the gross value added in the region in 2012. According to the latest available data for 2013, 94% of waste water in the region was treated before it was discharged from the public sewage system. This is significantly more than in Slovenia as a whole (78%). The expenditure on research and development (R&D), which amounted to 5.2% of the regional GDP in 2012, highlights the importance of R&D in the region. Businesses accounted for 90% of the sources of financing. The population's age structure in this region is favourable. In mid-2013 the value of the ageing index was 105.2, which means that the ratio between the population 65 or older and the population 15 or less was 105 older people per 100 young people.

Cities and towns 
The Southeast Slovenia Statistical Region includes six cities and towns, the largest of which is Novo mesto.

Municipalities
The Southeast Slovenia Statistical Region comprises the following 21 municipalities:

 Črnomelj
 Dolenjske Toplice
 Kočevje
 Kostel
 Loški Potok
 Metlika
 Mirna
 Mirna Peč
 Mokronog-Trebelno
 Novo Mesto
 Osilnica
 Ribnica
 Semič
 Sodražica
 Straža
 Šentjernej
 Šentrupert
 Škocjan
 Šmarješke Toplice
 Trebnje
 Žužemberk

Demographics
The population in 2020 was 145,357. It has a total area of 2,675 km2.

Economy
Employment structure: 43.4% services, 52.6% industry, 4% agriculture.

Tourism
It attracts only 3.3% of the total number of tourists in Slovenia, most being from Slovenia (52.8%).

Transportation
 Length of motorways: 52.7 km
 Length of other roads: 3603.1 km

Sources

 Slovenian regions in figures 2014

Statistical regions of Slovenia